Kelowna-Lake Country can refer to one of two electoral districts in British Columbia, Canada:
Kelowna—Lake Country, a federal electoral district in use from 2003 to present
Kelowna-Lake Country (provincial electoral district), a provincial electoral district in use from 2001 to present